Reuven Kalisher, resident of Zhytomir, was a Jewish doctor and Hebrew-language literist.

Vitiligo and Tzaraath
Kalisher maintained the view that the Torah mentioned Tzaraath is not Leprosy but in fact Vitiligo, Yehuda L. Katzenelson quotes Kalisher's view in his work on medicinal talmudic work (הרפואה וחכמת התלמוד berlin, 1928).

Literary works
 Natural works and medicine (Hebrew) Warsaw, 1862.

Russian Jews
19th-century physicians from the Russian Empire